Far or FAR may refer to:

Government
 Federal Acquisition Regulation, US
 Federal Aviation Regulations, US
 Florida Administrative Register, US

Military and paramilitary 
 Rebel Armed Forces, a defunct guerilla organization in Guatemala
 Cuban Revolutionary Armed Forces
 Royal Moroccan Armed Forces
 Rwandan Armed Forces
 Revolutionary Anarchist Front

Music
 Far (band), California, US
 Far (album), by Regina Spektor
 Far, an EP by Tina Dico
 "Far", a song by George Hrab
 "Far", a song by Longpigs
 "Far", a song by Gunna from the album Wunna
 F.A.R. (album), by Japanese singer-songwriter Marie Ueda
 "Far", by C418 from Minecraft - Volume Beta, 2013
"Far", a song by SZA from SOS (2022)

Places
 Far`, a village in Saudi Arabia
 Far, Iran, a village in Markazi Province
 Far, West Virginia, US
 Far Mountain, a mountain in British Columbia, Canada
 Fargo (Amtrak station), North Dakota, US, station code
 Hector International Airport, in Fargo, North Dakota, US, IATA code and FAA LID

Science, technology, and medicine
 Far Manager, a file manager for Microsoft Windows
 IPCC First Assessment Report, 1990
 Fuel–air ratio

Other uses
 FAR (Tracteurs FAR), a former French truck manufacturer
 Far: Lone Sails, a 2018 video game
 Far: Changing Tides, a sequel to Lone Sails
 Far Breton, a custard-based dessert
 FAR Rabat, a Moroccan football club
 Fataleka language, ISO 639-3 code
 Floor area ratio in real estate
 Fund for Armenian Relief
 Funlola Aofiyebi-Raimi, Nigerian actress
 The Ancient Roman name for the wheat emmer

See also
 Fars (disambiguation)